was a general in the Imperial Japanese Army during World War II.

Early career
Adachi was born into an impoverished family, originally descended from samurai, in Ishikawa Prefecture in 1890 (the 23rd year of the reign of Emperor Meiji, which is why his father, who had been a professional officer in the Japanese military, chose the kanji for "23" to represent his given name "Hatazō"). Too poor to afford the military preparatory schools necessary for a career in the Imperial Japanese Navy, as a youth he tested into the fiercely competitive Tokyo Cadet Academy, which enabled him to enter the Imperial Japanese Army Academy, from which he graduated from the 22nd class in 1910.

Adachi served with the 1st Imperial Guards Division, and then graduated from the 34th class of the Army War College in 1922. Unlike many Army officers of his day, Adachi avoided involvement in the political factions which plagued the Japanese Army in the 1930s. After serving in a number of staff and administrative positions within the Imperial Japanese Army General Staff, Adachi was assigned to the Railway Guard unit of the Kwangtung Army, responsible for the security of the South Manchuria Railway in 1933.

Career

Second Sino-Japanese War
Adachi was promoted to colonel in 1934, and was given command of the IJA 12th Infantry Regiment in 1936. During the Shanghai Incident of July 1937, Adachi also gained a reputation of leading his troops from the front, where the fighting was the thickest. He was injured by a mortar barrage in September, which permanently damaged his right leg.

He was promoted to major general in 1938, and promoted to commander of the IJA 26th Infantry Brigade. Adachi had a reputation as a "soldier's general", sharing the miserable living conditions of his troops and welcoming open discussion with his officer and staff.

Promoted to lieutenant general in August 1940, he was commander of the IJA 37th Division at the Battle of South Shanxi. In 1940, he became a Chief of staff of the North China Area Army from 1941 to 1942, during the height of its scorched earth campaigns against the Chinese forces.

Pacific War
On 9 November 1942, Adachi was appointed commander in chief of the newly formed 18th Army on Rabaul and the north coast of New Guinea from 1942 to 1945. The 18th Army contained the IJA 20th Division and IJA 41st Division, both of which arrived safely. However, the IJA 51st Division, including Adachi and his senior staff, came under Allied air attack while en route from Rabaul to Lae, in the Battle of the Bismarck Sea. All eight transport ships and four destroyers were sunk with the loss of 3,664 men, and only 2,427 men of the division were rescued.

With the defeat of the Imperial Japanese Navy in the Solomon Islands campaign, and with landings of US forces led by Douglas MacArthur at Aitape and Hollandia from 22 to 27 April 1944, isolated the vast majority of Adachi's forces. His forces, suffering from malaria, heat exhaustion and malnutrition were rendered ineffective for the remainder of the war, despite Adachi's efforts to achieve some form of self-sufficiency by planting crops and giving priority in rations to the sick. As ammunition began to run low, many of Adachi's commanders resorted to banzai charges against the Allied beachhead at Aitape rather than surrender. By the end of the war in September 1945, most of his forces had been annihilated. Of Adachi's original 140,000 men, barely 13,000 were still alive when the war ended. He surrendered to the Australian 6th Division at Cape Wom, by Wewak, New Guinea.

Postwar

At the end of the war, Adachi was taken into custody by the Australian government and charged with war crimes in connection with mistreatment and arbitrary execution of prisoners of war. Although not personally involved in any of the atrocities mentioned, Adachi insisted on absorbing command responsibility for the actions of his subordinates during the military tribunal. On 12 July 1947 he was sentenced to imprisonment for life. On 10 September that year he killed himself in his quarters with a paring knife in the prisoners' compound at Rabaul, having first written a number of letters.

In one of these, addressed to those officers and men of the Eighteenth Army who were then in the compound, he said:

Notes

References

External links

 Lieutenant General Adachi Hatazo, Australia–Japan Research Project

Japanese generals
1890 births
1947 suicides
Imperial Japanese Army generals of World War II
South Seas Mandate in World War II
Japanese military personnel who committed suicide
Japanese people convicted of war crimes
Japanese prisoners sentenced to life imprisonment
Seppuku from Meiji period to present
Suicides by sharp instrument in the Solomon Islands
People who committed suicide in prison custody
Japanese people who died in prison custody
Prisoners sentenced to life imprisonment by the Commonwealth of Australia
Prisoners who died in Commonwealth of Australia detention
Military personnel from Ishikawa Prefecture
Recipients of the Order of the Rising Sun